Shotgun Angel is the title of a 1977 song written by Bill Sprouse Jr.

The song was inspired by the many all night drives to and from concerts by Sprouse and his band The Road Home. As the band traveled in two old vans, they kept each other awake by talking and singing over the CB radio. The conversations between Bill and his sound technician Mike Shoup and drummer Ed McTaggart became the idea behind the song. The band's name "The Road Home" proved prophetic for Bill when he died soon so young.

After Sprouse's untimely death at age 26, Shoup dug up an old 4 track tape of the song and asked Dom Franco of the Maranatha! group Bethlehem to add pedal steel guitar to it. When Daniel Amos heard it they decided to record the song and even named their second album after it. The band also enlisted Franco to play the pedal steel and Shoup and McTaggart to add the CB radio voices on the recording.

The song went on to become a popular song for D.A. in the years that followed, and would later be covered by The 77s in 1999 for the D.A. tribute album, When Worlds Collide.

1977 songs
Citizens band radio in popular culture